Robert, Rob, Robbie, Bob or Bobby Elliott may refer to:

Clergymen
Robert Elliott (chaplain) (before 1755–after 1809), Scots-Irish Presbyterian clergyman in the United States
Robert W. B. Elliott (1840–1887), bishop of West Texas in the Episcopal Church

Entertainers
Robert Elliott (actor, born 1879) (1879–1951), American character actor
Bob Elliott (comedian) (1923–2016), American comic performer
Bobby Elliott (born 1941), English rock drummer with The Hollies
Robert Elliott (actor, born 1944) (1944–2004), American character actor
R. Bruce Elliott (Robert Bruce Elliott, born 1949), American actor and voice actor
Rob Elliott (born 1965), Australian television presenter

Public officials
Robert B. Elliott (1842–1884), African-American member of Congress from South Carolina
Robert G. Elliott (1874–1939), American executioner based in New York
Robert Elliott (Victorian politician) (1886–1950), Australian senator
Robert Ellsworth Elliott (1901–after 1959), Canadian politician
J. Robert Elliott (1910–2006), U.S. federal judge; Georgia state representative
Robert William Elliott, Baron Elliott of Morpeth (1920–2011), British Conservative party politician, MP 1957–1983
Bob Elliott (politician) (1927–2013), Member of the Legislative Assembly of Alberta, 1982–1993

Sportspeople
Bob Elliott (baseball) (1916–1966), American third baseman and right fielder in Major League Baseball
Bob Elliott (sportswriter) (born 1949), Canadian sports columnist
Robert Elliott (fencer) (born 1950), Hong Kong Olympic fencer
Robert Elliott (Australian rules footballer) (born 1953), Australian rules footballer
Bob Elliott (basketball) (born 1955), American basketball player and television sportscaster
Robbie Elliott (born 1973), English footballer

Others
Robert Elliott (songwriter) (before 1840–after 1880), English poet from Northumberland
Robert J. Elliott (born 1940), Canadian mathematician
Bob Elliott (medical researcher), New Zealand medical researcher

See also
Robert Elliot (disambiguation)